Savage Coast Campaign Book is an accessory for the 2nd edition of the Advanced Dungeons & Dragons fantasy role-playing game, published in 1996.

Contents
The Savage Coast Campaign Book contains information for a Savage Coast campaign, including descriptions of its nations to rules for creating player characters, and from details on the Legacies of the Red Curse to advice for running adventures.

Publication history
In 1996 the Savage Coast setting was revised and re-released under the AD&D: Odyssey line as three fully online products available for free download. This range included the base Savage Coast Campaign Book by Tim Beach and Bruce Heard, a supplement Savage Coast: Orc's Head and a Monstrous Compendium Appendix.

Reception

References

External links
 The Savage Coast Campaign Book

Mystara
Role-playing game supplements introduced in 1996